Oakridge was a light rail station on the Santa Clara Valley Transportation Authority (VTA) light rail system. This station was served by VTA's Ohlone/Chynoweth–Almaden line, popularly known as the Almaden Shuttle. The station had one platform, and was only accessed by the street. There was no parking available at the station.

Location
Oakridge station is located across Winfield Blvd from Westfield Oakridge Mall in southern San Jose, California.

History 

This station is on the former right-of-way of the Southern Pacific Railroad's "Lick Branch," where there was also a track for loading building materials into freight cars. The rail line was abandoned in 1981. The station was closed on December 27, 2019, when the light rail was replaced by a bus service.

References

External links

Former Santa Clara Valley Transportation Authority light rail stations
Santa Clara Valley Transportation Authority bus stations
Railway stations in San Jose, California
Railway stations in the United States opened in 1991
Railway stations closed in 2019
1991 establishments in California